Ethylamine, also known as ethanamine, is an organic compound with the formula CH3CH2NH2.  This colourless gas has a strong ammonia-like odor.  It condenses just below room temperature to a liquid miscible with virtually all solvents. It is a nucleophilic base, as is typical for amines.  Ethylamine is widely used in chemical industry and organic synthesis.

Synthesis
Ethylamine is produced on a large scale by two processes.  Most commonly ethanol and ammonia are combined in the presence of an oxide catalyst:
CH3CH2OH  +  NH3   →  CH3CH2NH2  +  H2O
In this reaction, ethylamine is coproduced together with diethylamine and triethylamine.  In aggregate, approximately 80M kilograms/year of these three amines are produced industrially.
It is also produced by reductive amination of acetaldehyde.
CH3CHO  +  NH3  +  H2   →  CH3CH2NH2  +  H2O

Ethylamine can be prepared by several other routes, but these are not economical. Ethylene and ammonia combine to give ethylamine in the presence of a sodium amide or related basic catalysts.
H2C=CH2  +  NH3  →  CH3CH2NH2
Hydrogenation of acetonitrile, acetamide, and nitroethane affords ethylamine.  These reactions can be effected stoichiometrically using lithium aluminium hydride.  In another route, ethylamine can be synthesized via nucleophilic substitution of a haloethane (such as chloroethane or bromoethane) with ammonia, utilizing a strong base such as potassium hydroxide. This method affords significant amounts of byproducts, including diethylamine and triethylamine.
CH3CH2Cl + NH3 +  KOH  →   CH3CH2NH2 + KCl + H2O

Ethylamine is also produced naturally in the cosmos; it is a component of interstellar gases.

Reactions
Like other simple aliphatic amines, ethylamine is a weak base: the pKa of [CH3CH2NH3]+ has been determined to be 10.8

Ethylamine undergoes the reactions anticipated for a primary alkyl amine, such as acylation and protonation.  Reaction with sulfuryl chloride followed by oxidation of the sulfonamide give diethyldiazene, EtN=NEt. Ethylamine may be oxidized using a strong oxidizer such as potassium permanganate to form acetaldehyde.

Ethylamine like some other small primary amines is a good solvent for lithium metal, giving the ion [Li(amine)4]+ and the solvated electron. Such solutions are used for the reduction of unsaturated organic compounds, such as naphthalenes and alkynes.

Applications
Ethylamine is a precursor to many herbicides including atrazine and simazine.  It is found in rubber products as well.

Ethylamine is used as a precursor chemical along with benzonitrile (as opposed to o-chlorobenzonitrile and methylamine in ketamine synthesis) in the clandestine synthesis of cyclidine dissociative anesthetic agents (the analogue of ketamine which is missing the 2-chloro group on the phenyl ring, and its N-ethyl analog) which are closely related to the well known anesthetic agent ketamine and the recreational drug phencyclidine and have been detected on the black market, being marketed for use as a recreational hallucinogen and tranquilizer. This produces a cyclidine with the same mechanism of action as ketamine (NMDA receptor antagonism) but with a much greater potency at the PCP binding site, a longer half-life, and significantly more prominent parasympathomimetic effects.

References

External links
 Safety data at www.inchem.org
 CDC - NIOSH Pocket Guide to Chemical Hazards

Alkylamines
Organic compounds with 2 carbon atoms